Ransomnematidae is a family of nematodes belonging to the order Rhabditida.

Genera:
 Clementeia Artigas, 1930
 Martadamsonius Van Waerebeke, 1987
 Ransomnema Artigas, 1926

References

Nematodes